Scotorythra dissotis is a moth of the family Geometridae. It was first described by Edward Meyrick in 1904. It is endemic to the Hawaiian island of Oahu.

External links

D
Endemic moths of Hawaii
Biota of Oahu